Darío Segovia Castagnino (18 March 1932 – 20 January 1994)  was a Paraguayan football defender who played for Paraguay in the 1958 FIFA World Cup. He also played for Club Sol de América.

References

External links

1932 births
1994 deaths
Paraguayan footballers
Paraguay international footballers
Association football defenders
1958 FIFA World Cup players
Club Sol de América footballers